This is a list of members of the Senate of Canada in the 39th Parliament of Canada.

At dissolution on September 7, 2008 there were 15 vacancies in the Senate: three each in British Columbia, Nova Scotia, and Quebec; two in Ontario; and each one in Newfoundland and Labrador, New Brunswick, Prince Edward Island, and Yukon. The resignation of Michael Fortier on September 7, 2008 subsequently created a 16th vacancy (4th in Quebec) on September 8.

The province of Quebec has 24 Senate divisions which are constitutionally mandated. In all other provinces, a Senate division is strictly an optional designation of the senator's own choosing, and has no real constitutional or legal standing. A senator who does not choose a special senate division is designated a senator for the province at large.

Names in bold indicate senators that served in the 28th Canadian Ministry.

List of senators

Senators at the beginning of the 39th Parliament

Senators appointed during the 39th Parliament

 Senators in bold were cabinet ministers during the 39th Parliament

3 Senator Hays served as Leader of the Opposition in the Senate until 18 January 2007.

4 Senator Hervieux-Payette was appointed as Leader of the Opposition in the Senate on 18 January 2007.

6 Appointed from the list of elected senators-in-waiting.

7 Appointed after the election but prior to the official start of the 39th Parliament.

Left Senate during the 39th Parliament

1 Died after the election but prior to the official start of the 39th Parliament.

Changes in party affiliation during the 39th Parliament

1 Changed after the election but prior to the official start of the 39th Parliament.

Party standings since election
The party standings have changed as follows since the election preceding the 39th Parliament:

See also
List of House members of the 39th Parliament of Canada
Women in the 39th Canadian Parliament
List of current Canadian senators

References

39
39th Canadian Parliament